The 1985 Japan Open Tennis Championships (also known as the 1985 Japan and Asian Open Tennis Championships) was a Grand Prix tennis tournament held in Tokyo, Japan. The tournament was held from 14 to 20 October 1985 and was played on outdoor hard courts. Scott Davis and Gabriela Sabatini won the singles titles.

Finals

Men's singles
 Scott Davis defeated  Jimmy Arias 6–1, 7–6

Women's singles
 Gabriela Sabatini defeated  Linda Gates 6–3, 6–4

Men's doubles
 Scott Davis /  David Pate defeated  Sammy Giammalva Jr. /  Greg Holmes 7–6, 6–7, 6–3

Women's doubles
 Belinda Cordwell /  Julie Richardson defeated  Laura Gildemeister /  Beth Herr 6–4, 6–4

References

External links
 Official website
  Association of Tennis Professionals (ATP) tournament profile

Japan Open
Japan Open
Japan Open Tennis Championships
Japan Open Tennis Championships
Japan Open (tennis)